Panday or Ang Panday may refer to:
 Panday (comics), a Philippine comics character created by Carlo J. Caparas and Steve Gan
Ang Panday (1980 film), a series of fantasy films from the Philippines, starring Fernando Poe, Jr.
Panday (2005 TV series), a TV series produced by ABS-CBN
 Ang Panday (2009 film), a film produced by GMA Films
 Ang Panday 2, a sequel for Panday; a film produced by GMA Films
 Panday Kids, a sequel to the 2009 GMA film
 Ang Panday (2016 TV series), a TV series produced by TV5
 Ang Panday (2017 film), seventh installment of the film series distributed by Star Cinema, and produced by CCM Productions and Viva Films.
"Ang Panday" (song), single from 2017 film
Pande family, a noble dynasty of Nepal that could be spelled Panday

People with the name or surname
 Panday Pira (1488–1576), Filipino blacksmith acknowledged as "The First Filipino Cannon-maker"
 Basdeo Panday (born 1933), former Prime Minister of Trinidad and Tobago

A variation of the Pandey surname
 Pandey is a surname found among the Hindu Brahmin communities of India and both the Brahmin and Chhetri communities of Nepal.